Musnad Abi Awanah is a collection of hadith compiled by the Islamic scholar Abu Awaanah al-Isfaraini. It is also known as Mustakhraj Abi Awanah.

Description
It is written in fourth century of Islamic calendar.  The musnad are collections of hadiths which are classified by narrators, and therefore by sahabas (companions of the prophet Muhammad). It was compiled by Imam Abu Awaanah al-Isfaraini in the late third century and early fourth century of the Islamic Calendar.
He claimed all hadith in it were authentic according to the conditions of Sahih Muslim.

Publications
The book has been published by many organizations around the world: 
  Musnad Abi Awanah 1/5 - Islam - Hadith - Early Work by Abu Awaanah al-Isfaraini: Published: Dar al-Marefeh, 2008 | UK 
  Musnad / Abu Awanah Yaqub ibn Ishaq Isfaraini. : Published: Daral-Maarifah lil-Talaah wa al-Mashr, [198-] | Libraries Australia

See also
 List of Sunni books
 Kutub al-Sittah
 Sahih Muslim
 Jami al-Tirmidhi
 Sunan Abu Dawood
 Jami' at-Tirmidhi
 Either: Sunan ibn Majah, Muwatta Malik

References

9th-century Arabic books
10th-century Arabic books
Sunni literature
Hadith
Hadith collections
Sunni hadith collections